The 1967 Buffalo Bulls football team represented the University at Buffalo in the 1967 NCAA University Division football season. The Bulls offense scored 241 points while the defense allowed 191 points.

Schedule

References

Buffalo
Buffalo Bulls football seasons
Buffalo Bulls football